The Intze Principle is a name given to two engineering principles, both named after the hydraulic engineer, Otto Intze, (1843–1904). In the one case, the Intze Principle relates to a type of water tower; in the other, a type of dam.

Intze Principle for water towers 

A water tower built in accordance with the Intze Principle has a brick shaft on which the water tank sits. The base of the tank is fixed with a ring anchor (Ringanker) made of iron or steel, so that only vertical, not horizontal, forces are transmitted to the tower. Due to the lack of horizontal forces the tower shaft does not need to be quite as solidly built.
This type of design was used in Germany between 1885 and 1905.

Intze Principle for dams 

The method of dam construction invented by Otto Intze was used in Germany at the end of the 19th and beginning of the 20th centuries. A dam built on the Intze Principle has the following features:
 it is a gravity dam with an almost triangular cross-section
 the wall is made of rubble stone with a high proportion of mortar
 it has a curved ground plan
 it has facing brickwork (Vorsatzmauerwerk or Verblendung) on the upper part of the upstream side
 it has an earth embankment against the lower part of the upstream side, the so-called Intze Wedge (Intze-Keil)
 it has a cement-sealed upstream face, coated with a layer of bitumen or tar
 it has internal vertical drainage using clay pipes behind the upstream face

The purpose of the Intze Wedge is to provide an additional seal in the area of the highest water pressure. During the 1920s, this type of construction was gradually superseded by concrete dams or arched dams which were cheaper to build.

See also 
 List of dams in Germany

References

External links 
 Otto Intze and water tower construction
 Otto Intze and dam construction
 Intze tanks at wassertuerme.gmxhome.de

Hydraulic engineering
Water towers
Dams